Tom Peterson (19 February 1898 – 12 April 1950) was an Australian rules footballer who played with Geelong in the Victorian Football League (VFL).

Notes

External links 

1898 births
1950 deaths
Australian rules footballers from Victoria (Australia)
Geelong Football Club players